Aveling is a surname, and may refer to:

 Edward Aveling (1849–1898), British socialist
 Eleanor Marx (1855–1898), sometimes called Eleanor Aveling 
 Francis Aveling (1875–1941), Canadian psychologist and Roman Catholic priest
 Harry Aveling  (born 1942), Australian scholar, translator and teacher
 Martin Aveling (born 1982), wildlife artist
 Thomas William Baxter Aveling (1815–1884), British Congregational minister
 Valda Aveling (1920–2007), Australian pianist, harpsichordist and clavichordist